The Hyundai Scoupe is a 2-door coupé based on the contemporaneous Hyundai Excel. The name, a portmanteau of "sporty" and "coupe," was pronounced "scoop". In the UK and other countries it is known as an "S Coupé".

History

Development of what would become the Scoupe started in 1985. At the 1989 Tokyo Motor Show, Hyundai exhibited a prototype which was named the "Sports-looking Car" (SLC) concept. Regular production began in February 1990; the Scoupe cost  billion to develop. The ambigram badging used an enlarged, stylized "S" followed by all-caps "COUPE".

The naturally-aspirated Alpha was introduced in April 1991, followed by a turbocharged Alpha in October of that same year. In the United States, additional changes came with the 1993 model year (July 1992), when Scoupes got a facelift, including the current Hyundai stylized-"H" logo, new flush headlamps plus body-colored side moldings and redesigned front sheetmetal, taillights, and rear bumper. The Base and LS models were equipped with a new and improved, in-house manufactured, 1.5L 12-valve, direct-port fuel-injected engine, called Alpha. 

The car was replaced by the Tiburon in 1996. When it was discontinued in 1995, the Scoupe was one of the last cars sold in the United States with motorized seat belts instead of airbags. In total, 242,441 Scoupes were produced: 63,998 sold domestically in Korea and 178,443 produced for export.

Scoupe Turbo
The Scoupe GT (LS Turbo in the USA) was Hyundai's first attempt at a sports car and featured South Korea's first domestically designed engine with a cast-iron block and crankshaft. The engine contains an aluminum head, aluminum pistons and titanium connecting rods. A special compact heatproof ceramic combustion chamber design with central spark plug location was incorporated to optimize engine efficiency. The engine utilizes a Robert Bosch GmbH electronic engine control system and a knock sensor. Thanks to the turbocharging, the engine produces .

The Turbo model can be distinguished externally by a black roof and "TURBO" badging on the rocker sills. Rod Millen drove a modified Scoupe GT (Turbo) to victory in the Showroom Stock 2WD class at the 1992 Pikes Peak International Hill Climb event.

In media
This car made an appearance on BBC's Top Gear Series 13 Episode 2 as Richard Hammond's car for the challenge where the presenters are finding the perfect car for a 17-year-old driver.

Preservation
Hyundai models of the late 1980s and early 1990s are almost impossible to find in preserved condition. , very few Scoupes are believed to remain in use. Several dedicated groups still exist, the main one being scoupetech found on Facebook. In Korea, the Sports Coupe Family (SCF) was the original Scoupe club, but is now defunct.

One facelifted white Scoupe has been preserved and is on display at the Hyundai Namyang Research Institute's R&D History Hall. Millen's Pikes Peak-winning 1992 Turbo has also been preserved.

Design and specifications

The 4G15 was replaced in 1993 by the 1,495 cc Alpha, with a  bore and an  stroke. It was available both as a naturally aspirated engine and a turbocharged engine. The naturally aspirated Alpha boasts a 14% increase in power over its 1.5L Mitsubishi-designed predecessor, and the turbo produces 42% more power. Turbos came only with 5-speed manual shift, while Base and LS models could have an optional 4-speed automatic.

Hyundai says the Scoupe was the first production application for Garrett Automotive Products' T15 turbocharger, which was new for the early 1990s. The turbo unit includes water-cooled bearings and housings and an integral wastegate.

Performance

For 1993 the Scoupe received a facelift and Hyundai's first internally-developed engine Alpha. The GT, equipped with the Alpha Turbo, achieved .

References

External links

 scoupetech on Facebook
 
 

Scoupe
1980s cars
1990s cars
Cars introduced in 1988
Coupés
Front-wheel-drive sports cars
Cars discontinued in 1995